The Nuraghe Arrubiu is one of the largest nuraghes in Sardinia. It is located in Orroli, in the province of South Sardinia. Its name means "red Nuraghe" in the Sardinian language, which derives from the basalt stones it had been built with.

The structure was built during the fifteenth century BC; the main tower originally reached a height of between 25 and 30 metres, making it one of the tallest structures in Bronze Age Europe. The main structure, which is made up of five towers, is protected by two secondary walls, making a total of 21 towers. The area covered by the complex is ca. 3000 square metres.
The Nuraghe was also provided with a complex drainage system that provided the cistern with water

See also

Talaiot

References

Museo Nazionale Archeologico di Nuoro, Il Sarcidano: Orroli, Nuraghe Arrubiu su www.museoarcheologiconuoro.beniculturali.it. URL consultato il 16 dicembre 2014.

Buildings and structures in Sardinia
Archaeological sites in Sardinia
Former populated places in Italy
Tourist attractions in Sardinia
Nuraghe